The Four Musketeers (Italian: I quattro moschettieri) is a 1936 Italian adventure film directed by Carlo Campogalliani. It is based on the 1844 novel The Three Musketeers by Alexandre Dumas. It reportedly involved the use of three thousand Marionettes.

Plot summary

Cast

References

Bibliography
 Moliterno, Gino. The A to Z of Italian Cinema. Scarecrow Press, 2009.

External links
 

1936 films
1930s Italian-language films
Films based on The Three Musketeers
Films directed by Carlo Campogalliani
Puppet films
Italian black-and-white films
1930s Italian films